Mallikarjuna is a name of the Hindu god Shiva.

Mallikarjuna may also refer to:

People
 Mallikarjuna (Shilahara dynasty), a 12th-century Indian ruler
 Mallikarjuna Rao (disambiguation), several people
 Mallikarjuna Raya, 15th century Indian ruler
 Mallikarjuna Reddy, Indian sculptors

Shiva temples
 Mallikarjuna Jyotirlinga in Andhra Pradesh, India
 Mallikarjuna Temple, Goa in Goa, India
 Mallikarjuna Temple, Basaralu in Karnataka, India
 Mallikarjuna Temple, Kuruvatti in Karnataka, India
 Mallikarjuna Temple, Hirenallur in Karnataka, India
 Komuravelli Mallikarjuna Swamy Temple in Telangana, India

Other
 Mallikarjuna (film), a 2011 Indian Kannada language film